Edward Macdonald Carey (March 15, 1913 – March 21, 1994) was an American actor, best known for his role as the patriarch Dr. Tom Horton on NBC's soap opera Days of Our Lives. For almost three decades, he was the show's central cast member.

He first made his career starring in various B-movies of the 1940s, 1950s and 1960s (with a few A-picture exceptions like Hitchcock's Shadow of a Doubt). He was known in many Hollywood circles as "King of the Bs", sharing the throne with his "queen", Lucille Ball.

Biography

Early life
Born in Sioux City, Iowa, Carey graduated from the University of Iowa in Iowa City with a bachelor's degree in 1935, after attending the University of Wisconsin–Madison for a year where he was a member of Alpha Delta Phi. He became involved with the drama school at the University of Iowa and decided to become an actor.

Radio and Broadway
Carey toured with the Globe Players. He began to work steadily on radio, including playing Dick Grosvenor on the soap opera Stella Dallas and Ridgeway Tearle in John's Other Wife, both in the early 1940s. He was also in Lights Out.

Carey was on Broadway in Lady in the Dark (1941) opposite Gertrude Lawrence, Danny Kaye and Victor Mature. His performance led to him receiving a contract offer from Paramount. He later recalled, "1941 was probably the greatest year of my life. I got my first big hit with Lady in the Dark, I got married and I signed with Paramount Pictures. I only wish I could remember it all better." The reason was his alcoholism.

Paramount and World War II service
Carey made his film debut in Star Spangled Rhythm (1942). Paramount gave him the third lead in Take a Letter, Darling (1942), directed by Mitchell Leisen. He followed it with Dr. Broadway (1942), which was his first starring role. He had a leading part in Wake Island (1942), directed by John Farrow, a big hit.

Carey's career received a boost when borrowed by Alfred Hitchcock at Universal to play the romantic lead in Shadow of a Doubt (1943) with Joseph Cotten and Teresa Wright. However the momentum was halted when he enlisted in the United States Marine Corps. He had two months before he left, which enabled him to star in a musical for Paramount, Salute for Three (1943). Carey received his commission in early 1944 and attended fighter director school at Camp Murphy in Orlando, Florida.  After school he served with Air Warning Squadron 3 with stints on Espiritu Santo, Bougainville and Mindanao.

In 1947 Carey returned to Paramount. They put him back into leading roles: Suddenly, It's Spring (1947), directed by Leisen, co-starring Paulette Goddard; Hazard (1948), again with Goddard; and Dream Girl (1948), supporting Betty Hutton, directed by Leisen.

Carey played Cesare Borgia in Bride of Vengeance (1948) alongside Goddard, directed by Leisen, but it was a flop. More popular was a Western, Streets of Laredo (1949), but William Holden was the hero; Carey was the villain.

In 1949 he co-starred as "Nick Carraway" in Alan Ladd's version of The Great Gatsby. Carey followed this with Song of Surrender (1949), once again directed by Leisen.

Universal and Fox
Universal borrowed Carey for two films: a Western with Maureen O'Hara,  Comanche Territory (1950), and South Sea Sinner (1950) with Shelley Winters.

Back at Paramount he was in a low budget Western, The Lawless (1950) directed by Joseph Losey. Back at Paramount he was a villain to Ray Milland in Copper Canyon (1950), directed by John Farrow. At Paramount he was Jesse James in The Great Missouri Raid (1951) and was in Mystery Submarine (1950) at Universal.

Carey supported Red Skelton at MGM in Excuse My Dust (1951).

At 20th Century Fox Carey supported Betty Grable in Meet Me After the Show (1951) and Claudette Colbert in Let's Make It Legal (1951). He went back to Universal for Cave of Outlaws (1951)

Carey began appearing on television in episodes of The Christophers, Celanese Theatre, Hope Chest, and Lux Video Theatre.

He continued to appear in films like My Wife's Best Friend (1952), at Fox with Anne Baxter; Count the Hours (1953), with Teresa Wright at RKO; Hannah Lee (1953), a Western with John Ireland; It's Everybody's Business (1953), and Málaga (1954) with Maureen O'Hara.

Carey returned to Broadway in Anniversary Waltz (1954–55), directed by Moss Hart, which was a big hit and ran for two years.

Television
Carey's work was increasingly on the small screen: The Quiet Gun, Stage 7, Science Fiction Theatre, Hour of Stars, Celebrity Playhouse, and The 20th Century Fox Hour. For the latter he appeared as Fred Gaily in a remake of the 1947 film classic, Miracle on 34th Street, starring Teresa Wright and Thomas Mitchell. He was also in General Electric Theater, Screen Directors Playhouse, The Alcoa Hour, and Climax!.  Carey managed a single, starring turn as a young professor traveling cross-country in the fifth season of Alfred Hitchcock Presents ("Coyote Moon") as well.

He did make some features such as Stranger at My Door (1956), a Western for Republic Pictures, and Odongo (1956) for Warwick Films.

Dr. Christian
In 1956 Carey took over the role of the kindly small-town physician Dr. Christian, a character created in the late 1930s by actor Jean Hersholt on radio and in films. Carey portrayed Dr. Christian on syndicated television for one season.

Carey guested on The Kaiser Aluminium Hour, The Joseph Cotten Show, Jane Wyman Presents the Fireside Theatre, Zane Grey Theatre, Wagon Train, Studio One in Hollywood, Playhouse 90, The Frank Sinatra Show, Suspicion, Target, Pursuit, Schlitz Playhouse, The Dupont Show of the Month, and Rawhide.

Carey was in the Western film Man or Gun (1958), for Republic. and The Redeemer (1959). He played patriot Patrick Henry in John Paul Jones (1959), directed by John Farrow who had worked with Carey at Paramount. He appeared in Blue Denim (1959).

Lock Up
Carey starred as crusading Herb Maris in the 1950s syndicated series Lock-Up. A total of seventy-eight episodes were made between 1959 and 1961.

Carey guest starred on Alfred Hitchcock Presents, Moment of Fear, Thriller ("The Devil's Ticket"), The United States Steel Hour, Insight, Target, Checkmate and The Alfred Hitchcock Hour.

Carey went to England to make the films The Devil's Agent (1962) and The Damned (known as These Are the Damned in the US) (1963), for director Joseph Losey. He was also in Stranglehold (1962),

In the first season of The Outer Limits, Carey starred in the episode titled "The Special One". He was also in The Dick Powell Theatre, Kraft Mystery Theatre, and Arrest and Trial,

Carey supported Sandra Dee in Tammy and the Doctor (1963). He guest starred in the 1964–1965 sitcom The Bing Crosby Show on ABC. He appeared as Mr. Edwards in the 1963 episode "Pay the Two Dollars" of the NBC education drama series, Mr. Novak, starring James Franciscus. He could also be seen on Burke's Law, Branded, Kraft Suspense Theatre, Run for Your Life, Ben Casey, Lassie, and Bewitched.

Days of Our Lives
Carey started playing Tom Horton on Days of Our Lives in 1965. He says he took the show "because I couldn't get a movie at the time". He ended up playing it until his death from lung cancer in Beverly Hills, California, in 1994, six days after his 81st birthday.

During this time, Carey suffered from a drinking problem, and eventually joined Alcoholics Anonymous in 1982.

A longtime pipe smoker, he was seen in many films and early episodes of Days of Our Lives with it. He was ordered by his doctor to quit in September 1991 after having to take a leave of absence from Days in order to remove a cancerous tumor from one of his lungs. He returned to the show in November of that year.

He is most recognized today as the voice who recites the epigraph each day before the program begins: "Like sands through the hourglass, so are the Days of Our Lives." From 1966 to 1994 he would also intone, "This is Macdonald Carey, and these are the Days of Our Lives." (After Carey's death, the producers, out of respect for Carey's family, decided not to use the second part of the opening tagline.) At each intermission, his voice also says "We will return for the second half of Days of Our Lives in just a moment". Since the Horton family is still regarded as the core of Days of our Lives, his memory has been allowed to remain imprinted on the show by leaving the voice-overs intact. He also served as voice-over for the very first PBS ident, in which he said "This is PBS ... the Public Broadcasting Service."

Other appearances
Carey continued to act in other productions during his run on Days. He had roles in Gidget Gets Married (1972), The Magician, Ordeal (1973), Owen Marshall, Counsellor at Law, Who Is the Black Dahlia? (1975), McMillan & Wife, Police Story, Switch, The Hardy Boys/Nancy Drew Mysteries, Fantasy Island and Buck Rogers in the 25th Century.

He later appeared in many all-star television miniseries, such as Roots, The Rebels, The Top of the Hill and Condominium.

He was in the films Foes (1977), End of the World (1977), and Summer of Fear (1978), and had a small part in American Gigolo (1980).

Carey was in the TV movie The Girl, the Gold Watch & Everything (1980) and the films Access Code (1984) and It's Alive III: Island of the Alive (1987).  He guest starred on Finder of Lost Loves, and Murder, She Wrote. His last non-Days role was in A Message from Holly (1992).

Carey did the onstage  introduction for the "Stars of the Days Of Our Lives" and musical artist/director Ricky Dee at the Greek Theatre (1992)

Writings
Carey wrote several books of poetry, and a 1991 autobiography, The Days of My Life. For his contribution to television, Carey has a star on the Hollywood Walk of Fame, at 6536 Hollywood Boulevard.

Personal life
Carey was married to Elizabeth Heckscher from 1943 until their divorce in 1969. They had six children: Lynn, Lisa, Stevens, Theresa, Edward Macdonald Jr., and Paul. Later, he dated Lois Kraines. The couple remained together from 1973 until Carey's death. His grandchildren include Ellie Diamond and Vytas and Aras Baskauskas. He has a godson, Maurice Heckscher.

Carey was a Roman Catholic, and a member of the Good Shepherd Parish and the Catholic Motion Picture Guild in Beverly Hills, California. He is buried at Holy Cross Cemetery in Culver City, California, alongside a space already set aside for his daughter Lisa.

Selected filmography

Star Spangled Rhythm (1942) – Louie the Lug in Skit
Take a Letter, Darling (1942) – Jonathan Caldwell
Dr. Broadway (1942) – Dr. Timothy Kane aka Dr. Broadway
Wake Island (1942) – Lt. Bruce Cameron
Shadow of a Doubt (1943) – Detective Jack Graham
Salute for Three (1943) – Buzz McAllister
Suddenly, It's Spring (1947) – Jack Lindsay
Variety Girl (1947) – Himself
Hazard (1948) – J.D. Storm
Dream Girl (1948) – Clark Redfield
Bride of Vengeance (1949) – Cesare Borgia
Streets of Laredo (1949) – Lorn Reming
The Great Gatsby (1949) – Nicholas 'Nick' Carraway
Song of Surrender (1949) – Bruce Eldridge
Comanche Territory (1950) – James Bowie
The Lawless (1950) – Larry Wilder
South Sea Sinner (1950) – William Jacob 'Jake' Davis
Copper Canyon (1950) – Deputy Lane Travis
Mystery Submarine (1950) – Dr. Brett Young
The Great Missouri Raid (1951) – Jesse James
Excuse My Dust (1951) – Cyrus Random, Jr.
Meet Me After the Show (1951) – Jeff Ames
Let's Make It Legal (1951) – Hugh Halsworth
Cave of Outlaws (1951) – Pete Carver
Count the Hours (1953) – Doug Madison
Hannah Lee: An American Primitive (1953) – Bus Crow
Fire Over Africa (1954) – Van Logan
Stranger at My Door (1956) – Hollis Jarret
Odongo (1956) – Steve Stratton
Man or Gun (1958) – 'Maybe' Smith / Scott Yancey
The Redeemer (1959) – Jesus Christ (voice)
John Paul Jones (1959) – Patrick Henry
Blue Denim (1959) – Major Malcolm Bartley, Ret.
The Devil's Agent (1962) – Mr. Smith
The Damned (1962) – Simon Wells
 Stranglehold (1963) – Bill Morrison
Tammy and the Doctor (1963) – Dr. Wayne Bentley
Daniel Boone (1965) Henry Pitcairn
Who Is the Black Dahlia? (1975, TV Movie) – Captain Jack Donahoe
Foes (1977) – McCarey
Roots (1977, TV Mini-Series) – Squire James
End of the World (1977) – John Davis
Stranger in Our House (1978, TV Movie) – Professor Jarvis
The Rebels (1979, TV Movie) – Dr. Church
Condominium (1980, TV Movie) – Dr. Arthur Castor
American Gigolo (1980) – Lawyer
Access Code (1984) – Senator Williams
It's Alive III: Island of the Alive (1987) – Judge Watson

Radio appearances

Awards
Daytime Emmy Awards
(1974) Daytime Emmy Outstanding Actor in a Daytime Drama Series for Days of Our Lives
(1975) Daytime Emmy Outstanding Actor in a Daytime Drama Series for Days of Our Lives
Soap Opera Digest Awards
(1984) Soap Opera Digest Award Outstanding Actor in a Mature Role in a Daytime Serial for Days of Our Lives
(1985) Soap Opera Digest Award Outstanding Actor in a Mature Role in a Daytime Serial for Days of Our Lives
(1990) Soap Opera Digest Editors Choice award

References

Bibliography

External links

Photographs and literature

1913 births
1994 deaths
Deaths from lung cancer in California
Burials at Holy Cross Cemetery, Culver City
20th-century American male actors
NBC network announcers
Paramount Pictures contract players
American male radio actors
American male film actors
American male television actors
American male soap opera actors
Days of Our Lives
Daytime Emmy Award winners
Daytime Emmy Award for Outstanding Lead Actor in a Drama Series winners
United States Marines
United States Marine Corps personnel of World War II
Actors from Sioux City, Iowa
University of Iowa alumni
University of Wisconsin–Madison alumni
Catholics from Iowa
Knights of the Holy Sepulchre
Western (genre) television actors